John Robert Akeroyd  (1952–) is a British botanist.

Life and work 
Educated at St. Andrew's University, he proceeded to Cambridge University for his doctorate on the ecological genetics of weeds.  His post-doctoral work was at Trinity College, Dublin (1979–1981), and then at the University of Reading, Plant Sciences Department as a post-doctoral fellow (1981–1999). At Reading he worked on the Flora Europaea. He succeeded William Stearn as editor of the Annales Musei Goulandris in 1999, and also editor of Watsonia. He has served as a vice-president of the Botanical Society of Britain and Ireland. there he was referee for Polygonaceae, and also served on the Meetings and Publications Committee. He frequently contributes to popular articles on conservation and botany and co-founded Plant Talk conservation magazine associated with the Eden Project. He is also known for his culinary skills.

He collected plants from the Mediterranean and Ireland, an contributed to the herbarium at Reading. John Akeroyd is the botanical authority, for a nearly twenty taxa, such  as Arenaria serpyllifolia L. subsp. aegaea (Rech.f.) Akeroyd. He was elected a Fellow of the Linnean Society (FLS) in 1982.

Selected publications 
 
 The wild plants of Sherkin, Cape Clear and adjacent Islands of West Cork. Sherkin Island Marine Station (1996)

References

Bibliography 

 
 
 
 
 
 
 
 

1952 births
20th-century British botanists
Living people
21st-century British botanists